Kohlrabi (pronounced ; scientific name Brassica oleracea Gongylodes Group), also called German turnip or turnip cabbage, is a biennial vegetable, a low, stout cultivar of wild cabbage. It is a cultivar of the same species as cabbage, broccoli, cauliflower, kale, Brussels sprouts, collard greens, Savoy cabbage, and gai lan.

It can be eaten raw or cooked. Edible preparations are made with both the stem and the leaves. Despite its common names, it is not the same species as turnip, although both are in the genus Brassica.

Etymology 
The name comes from the German Kohl ("cabbage") plus Rübe ~ Rabi (Swiss German variant) ("turnip"), because the swollen stem resembles the latter.

In Iran, it is called kalam qomi or kalam qomri and is used for various dishes, including a type of soup. In the northern part of Vietnam, it is called  (from French chou-rave); in eastern parts of India (West Bengal) and Bangladesh, it is called ōl kapi. It is also found in the Kashmir Valley in Northern India and is there known as monj-hakh, monj being the round part, and hakh being the leafy part. In the hilly areas of Jammu region and it's adjoining areas it's known as kādam and is eaten throughout the year. It is called nol khol in Northern India, navalkōl in Maharashtra, nūlkōl in Tamil, nūl kōl in Telugu, navilu kōsu in Karnataka and in Sri Lanka as knol khol (turnip cabbage). In Cyprus it is known as kouloumpra. It is eaten in the Czech Republic under name kedlubna, while in Slovakia it is known as kaleráb. In Romania, it is the gulie or cărălabă, which is similar to the Polish kalarepa and to the Hungarian karalábé, all of these last three denominations being adaptations of the German word Kohlrabi.

History 
The first European written record is by the botanist Mattioli in 1554 who wrote that it had “come lately into Italy”. By the end of the 16th century, kohlrabi spread to North Europe and was being grown in Austria, Germany, England, Italy, Spain, Tripoli and parts of the eastern Mediterranean.

Description 

Kohlrabi has been created by artificial selection for lateral meristem growth (a swollen, nearly spherical shape); its origin in nature is the same as that of cabbage, broccoli, cauliflower, kale, collard greens, and Brussels sprouts: they are all bred from, and are the same species as, the wild cabbage plant (Brassica oleracea).

The taste and texture of kohlrabi are similar to those of a broccoli stem or cabbage heart, but milder and sweeter, with a higher ratio of flesh to skin. The young stem in particular can be as crisp and juicy as an apple, although much less sweet.

Except for the Gigante cultivar, spring-grown kohlrabi much over 5 cm in size tend to be woody, as do full-grown kohlrabi much over perhaps 10 cm in size; the Gigante cultivar can achieve great size while remaining of good eating quality. The plant matures in 55–60 days after sowing and has good standing ability for up to 30 days after maturity. The approximate weight is 150 g. It grows well in hydroponic systems, producing a large edible bulk without clogging the nutrient troughs.

There are several varieties commonly available, including 'White Vienna', 'Purple Vienna', 'Grand Duke', 'Gigante' (also known as "Superschmelz"), 'Purple Danube', and 'White Danube'. Coloration of the purple types is superficial: the edible parts are all pale yellow.  The leafy greens can also be eaten.  One commonly used variety grows without a swollen stem, having just leaves and a very thin stem, and is called Haakh. Haakh and Monj are popular Kashmiri dishes made using this vegetable. In the second year, the plant will bloom and develop seeds.

Preparation and use 
Kohlrabi stems (the enlarged vegetal part) are surrounded by two distinct fibrous layers that do not soften appreciably when cooked. These layers are generally peeled away prior to cooking or serving raw, with the result that the stems often provide a smaller amount of food than one might assume from their intact appearance.

The bulbous kohlrabi stem is frequently used raw in salad or slaws. It has a texture similar to that of a broccoli stem, but with a flavor that is sweeter and less vegetal.

Kohlrabi leaves are edible and can be used similarly to collard greens and kale, but take longer to cook.

Kohlrabi is an important part of Kashmiri cuisine, where it is called Mŏnji. It is one of the most commonly cooked vegetables, along with collard greens (haakh). It is prepared with its leaves and served with a light soup and eaten with rice.

In Cyprus, it is popularly sprinkled with salt and lemon and served as an appetizer.

Kohlrabi is a common ingredient in Vietnamese cuisine. It can also be found in the dish nem rán, stir fry and canh. Raw kohlrabi is usually sliced thinly for nộm or nước chấm.

Some varieties are grown as feed for cattle.

References 

What is Kohlrabi?

External links 

 PROTAbase on Brassica oleracea (kohlrabi)
 Horticultural information on the tasty kohlrabi From the Learn2Grow databases
 Kohlrabi and Brussels Sprouts Are European
 

Brassica oleracea
Stem vegetables